Red Bank secure unit, part of Red Bank Community Home, was one of several English Local Authority Secure Children’s Homes (a juvenile detention facility) located in Newton-le-Willows, Merseyside. It opened in 1965, when it was one of three such units, and accepted both boys and girls. The unit closed in May 2015.

In 1990, when it housed 26 boys and young men convicted of serious crimes including murder, rape and arson, John Evans, the local member of parliament, described its work as "excellent and valuable" and said, "The special unit is not a harsh place, but it has rules that must be adhered to. The young people learn self-control and discipline in an affectionate environment that is sensitive to their special needs." It later specialised in accommodating child sex offenders. In 2009, it was one of nine secure children's homes in England.

Mary Bell was initially sent to the unit and it later housed Jon Venables, one of James Bulger's killers. Allegations that a female employee of the unit had engaged in sexual activity with Venables while he was imprisoned there were widely reported in 2011.

Since the 2015 closure, it has been alleged that at least one of the former care units were being used as a police training establishment.

References

Penal system in England
Youth detention centers
Defunct prisons in England
1965 establishments in England
2015 disestablishments in England